Sanjari Balod is one of the 90 Legislative Assembly constituencies of Chhattisgarh state in India. It is in Balod district.

Members of Legislative Assembly

Election results

2018

See also
List of constituencies of the Chhattisgarh Legislative Assembly
Balod district
Raipur

References

Balod district
Assembly constituencies of Chhattisgarh